The Oleska shale gas deposit is an unconventional gas area in Lviv, Ivano-Frankivsk and Ternopil oblasts in Ukraine. It will begin production in 2017 and will produce natural gas and condensates. The total exploration investment is expected to be about US$350 million. 

In December 2014, Chevron terminated the agreement with the Government of Ukraine for a 50 interest in and operatorship of Oleska Shale Block.

See also

References

Natural gas fields in Ukraine